is a Japanese footballer currently playing as a midfielder for Tokyo Verdy.

Career statistics

Club
.

Notes

References

External links

1999 births
Living people
Association football people from Hyōgo Prefecture
Meiji University alumni
Japanese footballers
Association football midfielders
Tokyo Verdy players